Mid Suffolk District Council in Suffolk, England is elected every four years. Since the last boundary changes in 2003, 40 councillors have been elected from 30 wards.

Political control
Since the first election to the council in 1973 political control of the council has been held by the following parties:

Leadership
The leaders of the council since 2003 have been:

Council elections
1973 Mid Suffolk District Council election
1976 Mid Suffolk District Council election
1979 Mid Suffolk District Council election (New ward boundaries)
1983 Mid Suffolk District Council election
1987 Mid Suffolk District Council election
1991 Mid Suffolk District Council election
1995 Mid Suffolk District Council election
1999 Mid Suffolk District Council election
2003 Mid Suffolk District Council election (New ward boundaries)
2007 Mid Suffolk District Council election
2011 Mid Suffolk District Council election
2015 Mid Suffolk District Council election
2019 Mid Suffolk District Council election (New ward boundaries)

By-election results

1995-1999

1999-2003

2003-2007

2007-2011

2011-2015

2015-2019

References

By-election results

External links
Mid Suffolk Council

 
Mid Suffolk District
Council elections in Suffolk
District council elections in England